The following is the list of the parliamentary constituencies in Uttarakhand as of recent-most delimitation of the Lok Sabha constituencies in 2008.

Lok Sabha

Current constituencies
The Lok Sabha (meaning "House of the People") is the lower house of the Parliament of India. Uttarakhand state elects five members and they are directly elected by the state electorates of Uttarakhand. Members are elected for five years with first-past-the-post voting. The number of seats, allocated to the state/union territory are determined by the population of the state/union territory.

Keys:

 Source: Parliament of India (Lok Sabha)

Former constituency
Nainital (2000–2009)

Rajya Sabha
The Rajya Sabha (meaning "Council of States") is the upper house of the Parliament of India. Uttarakhand state elects three members and they are indirectly elected by the members of Uttarakhand Legislative Assembly. Members are elected for six years and one-third of members are retired after every two years. Elections within the state legislatures are held using single transferable voting with proportional representation.

Current members
Keys:

Source: Parliament of India (Rajya Sabha)

See also
 List of constituencies of the Uttarakhand Legislative Assembly
 List of Lok Sabha members from Uttarakhand
 List of Rajya Sabha members from Uttarakhand

References

Parliamentary constituencies
Elections in Uttarakhand